The United States's Touchstone nuclear test series was a group of 13 nuclear tests conducted in 1987–1988. These tests  followed the Operation Musketeer series and preceded the Operation Cornerstone series.

The series included Touchstone Kearsarge, a joint US-Soviet test as part of the Joint Verification Experiment (JVE). The JVE's purpose was to provide yield data to both parties about each other's nuclear test sites so that accurate remote measurements could be taken to verify each other's compliance with the Threshold Test Ban Treaty.

List of the nuclear tests

References

Explosions in 1987
Explosions in 1988
Touchstone
1987 in military history
1988 in military history
1987 in Nevada
1988 in Nevada
1987 in the environment
1988 in the environment
Soviet Union–United States relations